Laetitia Sauzier (née Darche, born 22 June 1991) is a Belgian born Mauritian model of Belgian and Mauritian descent. She was the winner of the Miss Mauritius 2010 beauty pageant.

Early life 
Born in Uccle to Belgian father Michel and Mauritian mother Jacqueline, Darche spent her first three years of life in Mauritius. Her family then moved to Spain for ten years and to Belgium for the next five, where she would enjoy visiting her grandmother Rachelle in Jodoigne.

Darche speaks French, Spanish, English, Flemish and Mauritian Creole. She started her modeling career at age 16 and participated in Elite Model Look Mauritius 2009, where she obtained the Prix spécial du jury and finished second overall.

Prior to competing in Miss Mauritius, Darche was pursuing a bachelor's degree in sociology and economics at Paris-Sorbonne University and worked as a model doing photo shoots in France.

Miss Mauritius 2010
Darche competed as one of 14 finalists in her country's national beauty pageant, Miss Mauritius, held on 25 September 2010 in Bel Ombre, where she became the eventual winner of the title, gaining the right to represent Mauritius in Miss Universe 2011 and Miss World 2011.

Miss Universe 2011
Time magazine reckoned the dress worn by Laetitia Darche, as one of the worst for the Miss Universe 2011 competition. Time magazine described it as toilet paper for the curtains hanging on her arms.

Personal life
Laetitia Darche married Maxime Sauzier on 3 August 2012 at Cap Malheureux.
Her wedding dress was made by famous Mauritian stylist/designer Alexandra Juglall, who did a unique model for this occasion.
The wedding seems to have ended however.

References

1991 births
Living people
People from Uccle
Belgian female models
Mauritian female models
Mauritian beauty pageant winners
Miss Universe 2011 contestants
Belgian people of Mauritian descent
Paris-Sorbonne University alumni
Belgian expatriates in Spain
Belgian expatriates in France
Mauritian expatriates in Spain
Mauritian expatriates in France